The Beas River is a river in the northern part of India.

BEA Systems is an American software company.

Beas or BEAS may also refer to:

Places
 Beas, Punjab, a town in Punjab, India
 Beas, Spain, a town and municipality in Huelva province, Spain
 Beas de Granada, a town in Granada province, Spain
 Beas de Guadix, a municipality in Granada province, Spain
 Beas de Segura, a city in Jaén province, Spain
 Pong Dam, also known as Beas Dam, an earth-fill embankment dam on the Beas River
 Sheung Yue River, also known as River Beas, in Hong Kong

Other uses
 Beas Sarkar (born 1979), Indian cricketer
 INS Beas, ships of the Indian Navy

See also
 Bea (disambiguation)
 Beas Pind, a village in Punjab, India
 Bias (disambiguation)